Sivells Bend Independent School District is a public school district located in north central Cooke County, Texas (USA).

The district has one school that serves students in Pre-Kindergarten (Pre-K) through eighth grade.  High school students are bussed to the Muenster Independent School District.

In 2009, the school district was rated "recognized" by the Texas Education Agency.

References

External links
Sivells Bend ISD

School districts in Cooke County, Texas